The Cherkasy Regional Committee of the Communist Party of Ukraine, commonly referred to as the Cherkasy CPU obkom, was the position of highest authority in the Cherkasy Oblast, in the Ukrainian SSR of the Soviet Union.

The First Secretary was a de facto appointed position usually by the Central Committee of the Communist Party of Ukraine or the First Secretary of the Republic.

List of First Secretaries of the Communist Party of Cherkasy Oblast

See also
Cherkasy Oblast

Notes

Sources
 World Statesmen.org

Regional Committees of the Communist Party of Ukraine (Soviet Union)
Ukrainian Soviet Socialist Republic
History of Cherkasy Oblast
1954 establishments in the Soviet Union
1991 disestablishments in the Soviet Union